Apne Dam Par is a 1996 Indian Hindi-language action film directed by 3 Arshad, starring Mithun Chakraborty, Shilpa Shirodkar, Govinda, Sonali Bendre, Aasif Sheikh, Shakti Kapoor and Raza Murad.

Plot
The film portrays Ranjit Saxena (Shakti Kapoor) as a wealthy businessman, self-important and proud of his high status. He plans for his sister Sapna (Shilpa Shirodkar) to marry his business partner Verma's (Raza Murad) son. Unbeknownst to him, however, Sapna has been dating Ram (Mithun Chakraborty), a mechanic of lower social standing. Infuriated, he asks Sapna to leave Ram, but she remains resolute. Ranjit then invites Ram to his mansion, where he is insulted and then bribed to leave Sapna. He refuses, and Verma and Ranjit conspire to kill him. Instead, Sapna stops them, getting herself killed in the process. A crushed Ram vows never to marry, and to take care of his younger brother, Shayam (Irfan Kamal). Many years later, Shayam, now eligible to marry, tells Ram that he is in love with a girl named Divya (Anita Nigam). Ram agrees to the marriage and goes to meet her parents — to discover they are the Saxenas.

Cast

Mithun Chakraborty as Ram
Shilpa Shirodkar as Sapna Saxena
Aasif Sheikh as Karan Verma  Verma's Son	
Irfan Kamal as Ram's brother
Shakti Kapoor as Ranjit Saxena
Raza Murad as Verma
Avtar Gill as Diwanji
Kamaldeep as Chhote sarkar	
Mushtaq Khan as Mamaji
Kunika as Mamiji
Reema Lagoo as Mrs. Saxena
Shraddha Nigam as Divya Saxena
Yunus Parvez as Rahim chacha	
Tej Sapru as Pandeyji
Raju Shrestha as Raju
Govinda as Special appearance
Sonali Bendre as Special appearance
Ayesha Julka as item number

Soundtrack
The music was composed by Aadesh Shrivastava, with lyrics written by Anwar Sagar, Shyam Raj, Madan Pal, Dev Kohli and Yogesh.Tips Industries

Track listing
"Mujhe Is Tarah Se Dekha Hai Tune" - Udit Narayan, Sadhana Sargam
"Dil Deewana Sanam, Aa Lag Jaa Gale" - Udit Narayan, Sapna Mukherjee
"Tum Jo Rahoge Bas Khwaab Banke" - Vijeta Pandit, Kumar Sanu
"Ek Ladki Pataka, Dil Pe Daal Gayi Daaka" - Abhijeet, Poornima
"Teri Meri Aankh Ladi, Pyar Ki Masti Chadi" - Alisha Chinai
"Dil Ko Uda Ke Nazare Chura Ke" - Aadesh Shrivastava
"Aaraa Hile Chhaparaa Hile, Lachakegi Jab Kamariyaa" - Govinda

References

External links
 

1996 films
1990s Hindi-language films
Mithun's Dream Factory films
Films shot in Ooty
Films scored by Aadesh Shrivastava
Indian action drama films